Juan Caramuel y Lobkowitz (Juan Caramuel de Lobkowitz, 23 May 1606 in Madrid — 7 or 8 September 1682 in Vigevano) was a Spanish Catholic scholastic philosopher, ecclesiastic, mathematician and writer. He is believed to be a great-grandson of Jan Popel y Lobkowicz.

Life
Juan Caramuel was born in Madrid in 1606, the son of Count Lorenzo Caramuele and Caterina Frissea von Lobkowitz, a descendant of a German princely family. He was instructed in oriental languages by Archbishop Juan de Esron (Ezron). By the age of 17, he was studying at the University of Alcalá de Henares, where he took his degree in the humanities and philosophy.

He was a precocious child, early delving into serious problems in mathematics and even publishing astronomical tables at the age of ten, Camuelis primus calamus (Madrid 1617). He studied Chinese. He was received into the Cistercian Order at the monastery of La Espina, in the diocese of Palencia in 1625, and after ordination entered upon a varied and brilliant career. He served in the monastery of Montederramo (diocese of Orense), then Santa María del Destierro (Salamanca), where he completed his studies. He then taught in houses in Alcalá, Palazuelos, and Salamanca. He then travelled to Portugal for the sake of studying oriental languages, and from there he moved to the Low Countries (the Spanish Netherlands), where he resided from 1635 to 1644.

His sermons attracted the favorable attention of the Infante Ferdinand, Governor of the Low Countries, while he was attached to the monastery of Dunes in Flanders. He assisted Don Ferdinand in the defense of the city of Louvain from the attacks of the French and the Dutch, as engineer and chief of works, for which Don Ferdinand appointed him court preacher. Through Don Ferdinand, Caramuel became friends with Marie de' Medici, the exiled former queen-mother of France (1630–1642), who lived in Bruxelles, though she visited her daughter, the queen of England, for a period of three years. Through Marie's influence, Caramuel was appointed Vicar General of the Carthusians in England, Ireland, and Scotland; and named Abbot of Melrose.

In 1638 he defended his academic theses with great success, and was granted the degree of Doctor of Theology by the University of Leuven on 2 September 1638. Having learned more of the doctrines of Cornelius Jansen, who had died earlier in that year, Caraman embarked on a preaching crusade through Belgium and Germany, especially Mainz. An inscription in the cathedral of Vigevano claims he brought some 30,000 persons back to practicing Roman Catholicism.

Caramuel's patron, the Cardinal Infante Ferdinand, died on 9 November 1641. When he was obliged to leave the Electorate of the Palatinate, Philip IV of Spain made him his envoy to the court of Emperor Ferdinand III whose court was residing in Prague at the time. He was in turn Abbot of Melrose (Scotland), Abbot-Superior of the Benedictines of Vienna, Abbot of the Benedictine Emmaus Monastery in Prague (1647), and Grand-Vicar to the Archbishop of Prague, Ernst Augustus z Harrach (1623–1667).

In 1648, when the Swedes attacked Prague, Caramuel armed and led a military division of ecclesiastics who helped defend the city. His bravery on this occasion merited for him a collar of gold from the emperor. "Being active in the political struggles of his time and carrying out the project of re-Catholicisation perhaps too vigorously," according to Petr Dvořák, "he made himself many enemies even within the Catholic camp." He soon left Central Europe for Italy.

In 1656 Caramuel visited Rome for the first time, where Pope Alexander VII named him Consultor of the Holy Office (Inquisition) and Consultor of the Sacred Congregation of Rites. Pope Alexander knew Caramuel well, since he had been papal legate in Cologne from 1639 to 1651. Soon after, on 9 July 1657, he was named Bishop of Campagna e Satrianum (1657–1673), a small and poor diocese in the Kingdom of Naples.

On 25 July 1673, Caramuel was appointed to the diocese of Vigevano near Milan (1673–1682), which he held until his death on 8 September 1682.

Caramuel was in active correspondence with famous scholars: the philosophers René Descartes and Pierre Gassendi; the Jesuit polymath Athanasius Kircher; the Czech Capuchin friar and astronomer Anton Maria Schyrleus of Rheita, the Bohemian doctor Jan Marek Marci, Pope Alexander VII (Fabio Chigi), who was a great admirer of his work; the Belgian astronomer Godefroy Wendelin, the theologians Franciscus Bonae Spei and Antonino Diana, Giovanni Battista Hodierna, Johannes Hevelius, Valerianus Magnus, Juan Eusebio Nieremberg, and many others.

Works

His books are even more numerous than his awards and varied achievements. According to Jean-Noël Paquot, he published no fewer than 262 works on grammar, poetry, oratory, mathematics, astronomy, architecture, physics, politics, canon law, logic, metaphysics, theology, and asceticism. He distanced himself from all established philosophical schools of the Baroque era (he often praised Thomas Aquinas but explicitly denied being a Thomist). He loved to defend novel theories, and in Theologia moralis ad prima atque clarissima principia reducta (Leuven, 1643) tried to solve theological problems by mathematical rules. He was a leading exponent of probabilism and his permissive moral opinions were criticized in Pascal's Provincial Letters and gained for him from Alphonsus Liguori the title of "Prince of the Laxists".

His mathematical work centred on combinatorics and he was one of the early writers on probability, republishing Huygens's work on dice with helpful explanations. Caramuel's Mathesis biceps presents some original contributions to the field of mathematics: he proposed a new method of approximation for trisecting an angle and proposed a form of logarithm that prefigure cologarithms, although he was not understood by his contemporaries. Caramuel was also the first mathematician who made a reasoned study on non-decimal counts, thus making a significant contribution to the development of the binary numeral system.

The bishop was also responsible for the design of the facade of the Vigevano Cathedral.

Printed Works

Philippus Prudens, Antwerp, 1639.
Respuesta al Manifiesto del Reyno de Portugal, Antwerp, 1641.
Rationalis et realis philosophia, Leuven, 1642.
 
Theologia moralis fundamentalis, praeterintentionalis, decalogica, sacramentalis, canonica, regularis, civilis, militaris, Frankfurt, 1652–1653.
Theologia rationalis, Frankfurt, 1654–1655.
Theologia moralis fundamentalis, editio secunda, Rome, 1656.
Primus calamus ob oculos ponens metametricam, quae variis currentium, recurrentium, adscendentium, descendentium, nec-non circumvolantium versuum ductibus, aut aeri incisos, aut buxo insculptos, aut plumbo infusos, multiformes labyrinthos exponat, Rome, 1663.
 
 
Arquitectura civil recta y oblicua..., Vigevano, C. Corrado, 1678[-1679]. 
Leptotatos, latine subtilissimus, Vigevano 1681 (in Latin). (Spanish translation: Leptotatos [Neuva lengua sutilisima] Metalogica, Pamplona: Eunsa, 2008

Notes and references

Sources
J. Franklin, The Science of Conjecture: Evidence and Probability Before Pascal, Baltimore, Johns Hopkins University Press, 2001, 88-94.
J. Fleming, Defending Probabilism: The Moral Theology of Juan Caramuel, Washington DC: Georgetown University Press, 2006.
O'Neil, Leo  (1908). Juan Caramuel y Lobkowitz. The Catholic Encyclopedia. Vol. 3. New York: Robert Appleton Company, 1908. Retrieved: 31 October 2020 
Yanez Neira, Masolivier, Romereo, de Pascual, Juan Caramuel y Lobkowitz, in: Cistercium 262 (2014), p. 248-266.

Further reading

D. Pastine, Juan Caramuel : Probabilismo ed Enciclopedia, Florence, La Nuova Italia, 1975.
D. Pastine, "Dello scetticismo e del probabilismo all'operatività : Juan Caramuel", Rivista critica di storia della filosofia 30 (1975), p. 411-419.
P. Bellazi, Juan Caramuel, Vigevano, Editrice Opera Diocesana - Buona Stampa, 1982.
J. Velarde Lombraña, Juan Caramuel. Vida y obra, Oviedo, Pentalfa, 1989.
P. Pissavino (ed.), Le meraviglie del probabile. Juan Caramuel (1606–1682). Atti del convegno internazionale di studi, Vigevano 29-31 ottobre 1982, Vigevano, Comune di Vigevano, 1990.
U. G. Leinsle (2000), "Maria als Gegenstand der Philosophie. Zu Caramuels 'Philosophia Mariana'", in Den Glauben Verantworten. Bleibende und neue Herausforderungen für die Theologie zur Jahrtausendwende. Festschrift für Heinrich Petri, ed. E. Möde & Th. Schieder, Paderborn-München-Wien-Zürich, Ferdinand Schöningh, 2000, p. 59-66.
J. Schmutz, "Juan Caramuel on the Year 2000 : Time and Possible Worlds in Early-Modern Scholasticism" in The Medieval Concept of Time. The Scholastic Debate and Its Reception in Early Modern Philosophy, ed. P. Porro, Leiden-New York-Köln, Brill, 2001, p. 399-434.
A. Catalano, "Juan Caramuel Lobkovitz (1606–1682) e la riconquista delle coscienze in Boemia", Römische Historiche Mitteilungen 44 (2002), p. 339-392.
J. Fleming, "Juan Caramuel on the Nature of Extrinsic Probability", Studia Moralia 42 (2004), p. 337-360.
L. Robledo, "El cuerpo como discurso, retórica, predicación y comunicación non verbal en Caramuel", Criticón 84-85 (2002), p. 145-164.
Y. Schwartz, ed. & transl., Ioannes Caramuel Lobkowitz. On Rabbinic Atheism, translated from the Latin with Introduction by M.-J. Dubois, A. Wohlman, Y. Schwartz, Notes to the text by Y. Schwartz, Jerusalem, The Hebrew University Magnes Press, 2005 [in Hebrew].
A. Serrai, Phoenix Europae. Juan Caramuel y Lobkowitz in prospettiva bibliografica, Milan, Edizioni Sylvestre Bonnard, 2005.
H. W. Sullivan, "Fray Juan Caramuel y Lobkowitz, O.Cist.: The Prague Years, 1647–1659", in "Corónente tus hazañas". Studies in Honor of John Jay Allen, ed. M. J. McGrath, Newark (DE), Juan de la Cuesta Hispanic Studies, 2005, p. 339-374.
P. Dvorák, Jan Caramuel z Lobkovic : Vybrané aspekty formální a aplikované logiky [Juan Caramuel y Lobkovitz: Various Aspects of Formal and Applied Logic], Prague, Oikumene, 2006.
J. Schmutz, "Juan Caramuel y Lobkowitz (1606-82)", in Centuriae latinae II. Cent et une figures humanistes de la Renaissance aux Lumières, à la mémoire de Marie-Madeleine de la Garanderie, ed. C. Nativel, Geneva, Droz, 2006, p. 182-202.
P. Dvorák, Relational logic in Juan Caramuel in: Mediaeval and Renaissance Logic, Volume 2 (Handbook of the History of Logic) ed. D. M. Gabby, J. Woods, Amsterdam, North-Holland, 2008 pp. 645–666.

See also
List of Roman Catholic scientist-clerics
Lobkowicz

External links
 
Proceedings of the Caramuel Conference, Prague 2006
Caramuel page on the site Scholasticon by Jacob Schmutz (Works and Bibliography)
The Galileo Project

Spanish essayists
Spanish male writers
17th-century Spanish mathematicians
Catholic clergy scientists
Spanish scientists
17th-century Spanish Roman Catholic theologians
Spanish Cistercians
Spanish architecture writers
People from Madrid
Spanish people of German descent
1606 births
1682 deaths
People from Campagna
17th-century philosophers
Male essayists
17th-century male writers